"Shri Ramachandra Kripalu" or "Shri Ram Stuti" is a Stuti (Horation Ode) verse from the his work called Vinaya Patrika, written by Goswami Tulsidas. It was written in the sixteenth century, in a mix of Sanskrit and Awadhi languages. The prayer/ode glorifies Shri Rāma and his characteristics to the best.

Original version:

MIX of Awadhi amd Sanskrit

॥ श्रीरामचन्द्र कृपालु ॥

श्री रामचन्द्र कृपालु भजुमन हरण भवभय दारुणं ।
नव कञ्ज लोचन कञ्ज मुख कर कञ्ज पद कञ्जारुणं ॥१॥
 
कन्दर्प अगणित अमित छवि नव नील नीरद सुन्दरं ।
पटपीत मानहुँ तडित रुचि शुचि नौमि जनक सुतावरं ॥२॥
 
भजु दीनबन्धु दिनेश दानव दैत्य वंश निकन्दनं ।
रघुनन्द आनन्द कन्द कोसल चंद्र दशरथ नन्दनं ॥३॥

सिर मुकुट कुंडल तिलक चारु उदार अङ्ग विभूषणं ।
आजानु भुज शर चाप धर संग्राम जित खरदूषणं ॥४॥

इति वदति तुलसीदास शंकर शेष मुनि मन रंजनं ।
मम हृदय कंज निवास कुरु कामादि खलदल गंजनं ॥५॥

मनु जाहि राचेयु मिलहि सो वरु सहज सुन्दर सांवरो ।
करुणा निधान सुजान शीलु स्नेह जानत रावरो ॥६॥

एहि भांति गौरी असीस सुन सिय सहित हिय हरषित अली।
तुलसी भवानिहि पूजी पुनि-पुनि मुदित मन मन्दिर चली ॥७॥

           ॥सोरठा॥
जानी गौरी अनुकूल सिय हिय हरषु न जाइ कहि ।
मंजुल मंगल मूल वाम अङ्ग फरकन लगे।

            ||चौपाई||

मौसम दीन न दीन हितय , तुम समान रघुबीर ।
असुविचार रघुवंश मणि, हरहु विषम भव वीर ।।

कामिही  नारि  पियारी जिमि , लोभिहि   प्रिय जिमि  दाम  ।
तिमि  रघुनाथ निरंतरय , प्रिय लागेहू  मोहि राम ।।

अर्थ न धर्मे न काम रुचि,‌ गलिन चाहु रघुवीर ।
जन्म जन्म सियाराम पद,  यह वरदान न आन ।।

विनती कर मोहि मुनि नार सिर, कहीं-करी जोर बहोर ।
चरण सरोरहु नाथ जिमी, कबहु बजई भाति मोर ।।

श्रवण सोजस सुनि आयहु, प्रभु भंजन भव वीर ।
त्राहि-त्राहि आरत हरण शरद सुखद रघुवीर ।।

जिन पायन के पादुका, भरत रहे मन लाई ।
तेहीं पद आग विलोकि हऊ,  इन नैनन अब जाहि ।।

काह कही छवि आपकी,  मेल विरजेऊ नाथ ।
तुलसी मस्तक तव नवे, धनुष बाण ल्यो हाथ ।।

कृत मुरली कृत चंद्रिका, कृत गोपियन के संग ।
अपने जन के कारण, कृष्ण भय रघुनाथ ।।

लाल देह लाली लसे, अरू धरि लाल लंगूर ।
बज्र देह दानव दलन, जय जय कपि सूर ।।

जय जय राजा राम की, जय लक्ष्मण बलवान ।
 जय कपीस सुग्रीव की, जय अंगद हनुमान ।।

जय जय कागभुसुंडि की , जय गिरी उमा महेश ।
जय ऋषि भारद्वाज की, जय तुलसी अवधेश ।।

बेनी सी पावन परम, देमी सी फल चारु ।
स्वर्ग रसेनी हरि कथा, पाप निवारण हार ।।

राम नगरिया राम की, बसे गंग के तीर । 
अटल राज महाराज की, चौकी हनुमान वीर ।।

राम नाम के लेत ही, सकल पाप कट जाए ।
जैसे रवि के उदय से, अंधकार मिट जाए ।।

श्री गुरु चरण सरोज रज, निज मनु मुकुरु सुधारि ।
बरनउँ रघुबर बिमल जसु, जो दायकु फल चारि ।।

बुद्धिहीन तनु जानिके, सुमिरौं पवन कुमार ।
बल बुद्धि विद्या देहु मोहि, हरहु कलेश विकार ।।

जय गणेश गिरिजा सुवन, मंगल मूल सुजान ।
कहत अयोध्या दास तवे देहु अभेय वरदान ।।

नहीं विद्या नहीं बाहुबल, नहीं खरचन कों दाम ।
मौसम पतित पतंग को, तुम पति राघव राम ।।

एक धरी आधी धरी, और आधि की आधि ।
तुलसी संगत साधु की, हारई कोटि अपराध ।।

सियावर रामचन्द्र जी की जय ।

Transliteration

॥ Shriramachandra Kripalu॥

Śrīrāmacandra kr̥pālu bhajamana haraṇabhavabhayadāruṇaṁ.
Navakañjalocana kañjamukha karakañja padakañjāruṇaṁ. ।।1।।

Kandarpa agaṇita amita chavi navanīlanīradasundaraṁ.
Paṭapītamānahu taḍita ruciśuci naumijanakasutāvaraṁ. ।।2।।

Bhajadīnabandhu dinēśa dānavadaityavaṁśanikandanaṁ.
Raghunanda ānandakanda kośalachandra daśarathanandanaṁ. ।।3।।

Śiramukuṭakuṇḍala tilakacāru udāru'aṅgavibhūṣaṇaṁ.
Ājānubhuja śaracāpadhara saṅgrāmajitakharadūṣaṇaṁ. ।।4।।

Iti vadati tulasīdāsa śaṅkaraśeṣamunimanarañjanaṁ.
Mamahru
dayakañjanivāsakuru kāmādikhaladalagañajanaṁ. ।।5।।

Hindi Translation

हे मन कृपालु श्रीरामचन्द्रजी का भजन कर । वे संसार के जन्म-मरण रूपी दारुण भय को दूर करने वाले हैं । 
उनके नेत्र नव-विकसित कमल के समान हैं । मुख-हाथ और चरण भी लालकमल के सदृश हैं ॥१॥

उनके सौन्दर्य की छ्टा अगणित कामदेवों से बढ़कर है । उनके शरीर का नवीन नील-सजल मेघ के जैसा सुन्दर वर्ण है । 
पीताम्बर मेघरूप शरीर मानो बिजली के समान चमक रहा है । ऐसे पावनरूप जानकीपति श्रीरामजी को मैं नमस्कार करता हूँ ॥२॥

हे मन दीनों के बन्धु, सूर्य के समान तेजस्वी, दानव और दैत्यों के वंश का समूल नाश करने वाले, 
आनन्दकन्द कोशल-देशरूपी आकाश में निर्मल चन्द्रमा के समान दशरथनन्दन श्रीराम का भजन कर ॥३॥

जिनके मस्तक पर रत्नजड़ित मुकुट, कानों में कुण्डल भाल पर तिलक, और प्रत्येक अंग मे सुन्दर आभूषण सुशोभित हो रहे हैं ।
जिनकी भुजाएँ घुटनों तक लम्बी हैं । जो धनुष-बाण लिये हुए हैं, जिन्होनें संग्राम में खर-दूषण को जीत लिया है ॥४॥

जो शिव, शेष और मुनियों के मन को प्रसन्न करने वाले और काम, क्रोध, लोभादि शत्रुओं का नाश करने वाले हैं, 
तुलसीदास प्रार्थना करते हैं कि वे श्रीरघुनाथजी मेरे हृदय कमल में सदा निवास करें ॥५॥

जिसमें तुम्हारा मन अनुरक्त हो गया है, वही स्वभाव से सुन्दर साँवला वर (श्रीरामचन्द्रजी) तुमको मिलेगा।
वह जो दया का खजाना और सुजान (सर्वज्ञ) है, तुम्हारे शील और स्नेह को जानता है ॥६॥

इस प्रकार श्रीगौरीजी का आशीर्वाद सुनकर जानकीजी समेत सभी सखियाँ हृदय मे हर्षित हुईं।
तुलसीदासजी कहते हैं, भवानीजी को बार-बार पूजकर सीताजी प्रसन्न मन से राजमहल को लौट चलीं ॥७॥

॥सोरठा॥
गौरीजी को अनुकूल जानकर सीताजी के हृदय में जो हर्ष हुआ वह कहा नही जा सकता। सुन्दर मंगलों के मूल उनके बाँये अंग फड़कने लगे ॥

English Translation

O mind! Revere the benign Shri Ramachandra, who removes 'Bhava' the worldly sorrow or pain, 'Bhaya' the fear, and 'Daruna' the scarcity or poverty.
 Who has fresh lotus eyes, lotus face and lotus hands, feet like lotus and like the rising sun. ॥1॥

 His beauty exceeds innumerable Kaamdevs (Cupids). He is like a newly formed beautiful blue cloud. The yellow robe on his body appears like delightful lighting. 
 He is the consort of the daughter of Sri Janak (Sri Sita), the embodiment of sacredness.॥2॥

O mind, sing praises of Sri Ram, a friend of the poor. He is the lord of the solar dynasty. He is the destroyer of demons and devils.
 The descendant of Sri Raghu is the source of joy, a moon of his mother Kaushalya and he is the son of Sri Dashrath.॥3॥

 He wears a crown on his head, pendants on his ear, and tilak (crimson mark) on his forehead. All his organs are beautiful and well decorated with ornaments. 
 His arms reach his knees. He holds a bow and an arrow. He emerged victorious in the battle with demons Khar and Dushan.॥4॥

 Thus says Sri Tulsidas – O Sri Ram, the charmer of Lord Shiv, Sri Shesh and saints, 
 reside in the lotus of my heart and destroy all the evils and their associates like desires.॥5॥

See also
 Vaishnava Jana To
 Hari Tuma Haro
 Hanuman Chalisa
 Ramcharitmanas
 Tulsidas

In popular culture

This song is sung by many Indian singers such as Lata Mangeshkar, Anup Jalota. and Jagjit singh Ji as well.

References

 https://www.youtube.com/watch?v=MyNSOu-Fl-k Sooryagayathri
 http://gaana.com/song/shree-ram-chandra-kripalu-bhajman-5 Anup Jalota-Ganna
https://chalisasangrah.in/Stuti/Ram-StutiRam Stuti Lyrics

Hindu prayer and meditation